Hilarographa sepidmarginata is a species of moth of the family Tortricidae. It is found in the Cordillera Occidental of Colombia.

The wingspan is about 29 mm. The ground colour of the forewings is restricted to irregular orange maculation (spots), lines extending from the costa and a small area beneath the apex. The costal strigulae (fine streaks) are white and the subapical area is pale orange. The remaining area is dark brown. The hindwings are yellow orange except for a broad terminal border.

Etymology
The specific name refers to the colouration of the hindwing and is derived from Latin sepia (meaning black paint) and marginata (meaning bordered).

References

Moths described in 2011
Hilarographini